Kongur Tagh or Kongkoerh (Kyrgyz: Коңур Тоо; Uyghur: , Коңур Тағ, meaning "Brown Mountain"; , (Хонгор/Kongur/Kongur is Mongolian word for the color Mongolians use for Buckskin colored horse) Hongor Tag; ; also referred to as Kongur), is the highest peak in the Pamir Mountains, and also the highest mountain wholly within the Xinjiang Uyghur Autonomous Region, China.

Geography
Kongur Tagh is within a range called the Kongur Shan (.)  Kongur Tagh is located just north of Muztagh Ata and visible from Karakul Lake. Some sources use "Kongur Shan" mistakenly to refer to the peak itself.  The Kongur Shan range, including Muztagh Ata, is separated by the major Yarkand River valley from the Kunlun Mountains and thus is included in the "Eastern Pamirs".  Kongur Tagh is the highest peak in the Pamirs.  Due to its remoteness and being hidden by nearby peaks, Kongur was not discovered by Europeans until 1900. However, the building of the Karakoram Highway from Pakistan to China, which runs past nearby Tashkurgan and Karakul Lake, has now made it more accessible.

Administratively, the Kongur Range is within Akto County.

Climbing history
The first attempt to climb Kongur Tagh was made in 1956 but the party aborted the attempt when it realized it was beyond their abilities.

The first ascent of Kongur Tagh was completed in 1981 by a British expedition consisting of Chris Bonington, Al Rouse, Peter Boardman and Joe Tasker.

Elevation
Kongur Tagh is 7,649 meters high. Some sources list the peak's elevation as 7,719 meters, but this is likely incorrect. The main summit is close enough in height to the 7,625-meter-high northeastern summit that climbers standing on the main summit could not tell which was taller, thus it can not be 7,719 meters high.

Footnotes

See also
 Karakoram Highway
 Kongur Tiube

References
 Ward, Michael. (1983). "The Kongur Massif in Southern Sinkiang." The Geographical Journal, Vol. 149, No. 2 (Jul., 1983), pp. 137–152.

External links

 

Mountains of Xinjiang
Highest points of Chinese provinces
Seven-thousanders of the Pamir
Tashkurgan Tajik Autonomous County